Centerville is an area in Garland, Texas, United States; it used to be a distinct unincorporated community in Dallas County.

External links
 CENTERVILLE, TEXAS (Dallas County) Handbook of Texas

Geography of Garland, Texas